Luiyi Ramón de Lucas Pérez (born 31 August 1994) is a Dominican footballer who plays as a defender for Scottish club Livingston and the Dominican Republic national team. He also holds Spanish citizenship.

Club career
On 21 January 2022, he returned to Haka for the 2022 season.

International career
De Lucas made his formal debut for Dominican Republic on 12 October 2018, playing an entire 3–0 win against Cayman Islands for the 2019–20 CONCACAF Nations League qualification. He had played a match against Bonaire on 9 September 2018, but it was not recognised by FIFA.

Honors and awards

Clubs
Cibao
Liga Dominicana de Fútbol: 2018

Haka
 Player of the Year: 2021

References

External links
Luiyi de Lucas en Fútbol Dominicano. Net

1994 births
Living people
Dominican Republic footballers
Association football central defenders
Club Barcelona Atlético players
Cibao FC players
FC Haka players
Liga Dominicana de Fútbol players
Veikkausliiga players
Dominican Republic international footballers
Dominican Republic expatriate footballers
Dominican Republic expatriate sportspeople in Finland
Expatriate footballers in Finland
Dominican Republic emigrants to Spain
Naturalised citizens of Spain
Spanish footballers
CD Guadalajara (Spain) footballers
CD Azuqueca players
La Roda CF players
CD Izarra footballers
Divisiones Regionales de Fútbol players
Tercera División players
Segunda División B players
Spanish expatriate footballers
Spanish expatriate sportspeople in Finland
Expatriate footballers in Scotland
Livingston F.C. players